American Bicycle Manufacturing was a company making custom mountainbikes, founded by Fred Schilplin (February 16, 1947 – April 13, 2005) in St. Cloud, Minnesota, United States. The company was known for producing mountain bikes whose welds were left untreated, showcasing the art of welding.

Models produced 
1985 American Montaneus
1988 American Montaneus
1988 American Comp Lite
1993 American M 16
1994 American ELF

External links 
American M16
Timeline of American Bicycle Manufacturing
Fred Schiplin
American Bicycle Manufacturing BMX- Museum
Chitti-Chat

Manufacturing companies based in Minnesota